The Smetana Quartet was a Czech string quartet that was in existence from 1945 to 1989.

Personnel 
1st violin
 Václav Neumann (1920-1995), from 1943 to 1945
 Jaroslav Rybenský, from 1945 to 1947
 Jiří Novák (1924-2010), since 1947

2nd violin
 Lubomír Kostecký (1922-2003)

Viola
 Jiří Neumann, from 1943 to 1945
 Václav Neumann, from 1945 to 1947
 Jaroslav Rybenský, from 1947 to 1956
 Milan Škampa (1928-2018), since 1956

Cello
 Antonín Kohout (1919-2013)

Origins and activities 
The Smetana Quartet arose from the Quartet of the Czech Conservatory, which was founded in 1943 (during the Nazi occupation) in Prague by Antonín Kohout, the cellist. With Jaroslav Rybenský and Lubomír Kostecký as first and second violins, and Václav Neumann as violist, the group gave its first performance as the Smetana Quartet on 6 November 1945, at the Municipal Library in Prague. Neumann left to pursue conducting in 1947, at which point Rybenský went to the viola desk and Jiří Novák (who shared first violin desk with Josef Vlach, founder of the Vlach Quartet, under Vaclav Talich in the Czech Chamber Orchestra) came in as first violin.

By 1949 the group had official connections with the Czech Philharmonic. The first foreign tour was in 1949, to Poland, and the first recording was of a quartet by Bedřich Smetana in 1950. Rybenský was obliged to retire after ill health in 1952, and was replaced by Milan Škampa. The performers were appointed professors at the Academy of Musical Arts in 1967. Of their many recordings, those made at that time for German Electrola are considered particularly fine.

For many years this group, which has been called the finest Czech quartet of its time, played the Czech repertoire from memory, giving these works a special intensity and intimacy.

The Smetana Quartet made the third commercial digital recording ever made, Mozart's K.421 and K.458, in Tokyo April 24–26, 1972.  They rerecorded the same repertoire ten years later in Prague.

Antonín Kohout trained the Kocian Quartet (founded 1972) and the Martinů Quartet (1976), though the latter's members had been pupils of Professor Viktor Moučka, cellist of the Vlach Quartet.

External links 
Discographyá
The Smetana Quartet website -  rich photogallery, repertoire, records

Notes and references 
Notes

Bibliography
Vladimír Šefl, Smetanovo Kvarteto (Supraphon, 1974)
Jirǐ Berkovec, The Smetana Quartet (Orbis 1956)

Czech string quartets
Musical groups established in 1945